The following is a comprehensive discography of British rock band the Sweet.

Albums

Studio albums

Live albums

Compilation albums

Box sets

Video albums

Singles

Notes

References
General

Specific

External links
 thesweet.com/hsh – Official Sweet Fansite
Sweet – "Give Us a Link": Sweet discography (fan site)

Rock music group discographies
Discographies of British artists
Discography